Palam is a Nepalese folk song of the Limbu community. It is sung in various cultural gatherings and events such as marriage, festivals, carnivals. etc. It is typically sung while dancing Dhan Nach. It is sung step by step as a question and answer session between the boy and the girl. It contains various subjects such as origin of creation, from the evolution of human civilization to love.

Traditionally, no instrument were used while singing Palam but nowadays, modern as well as traditional instruments are used.

See also 

 Dohori
 Deuda

References 

Nepalese folk music
Limbu culture
Nepalese musical genres
Culture of Koshi Province